A standard inspection procedure (or sometimes just 'SIP') is a process by which a number of variables may be checked for compliance against a set of rules. SIPs are used by various organizations including the Commercial Vehicle Safety Alliance (CVSA) and the U.S. Department of Defense.

References

Regulatory compliance
Quality assurance